The communauté de communes de la Terre des Deux Caps is located in the Pas-de-Calais département, in northern France. It was established on 1 January 2002. Its seat is Marquise. Its area is 183.3 km2, and its population was 22,197 in 2018.

Composition
The communauté de communes consists of the following 21 communes:

Ambleteuse 
Audembert  
Audinghen 
Audresselles  
Bazinghen 
Beuvrequen  
Ferques  
Hervelinghen  
Landrethun-le-Nord  
Leubringhen 
Leulinghen-Bernes  
Maninghen-Henne 
Marquise 
Offrethun 
Rety 
Rinxent 
Saint-Inglevert  
Tardinghen 
Wacquinghen  
Wierre-Effroy  
Wissant

References

External links 
 Official website de la Terre des 2 Caps

Terre des Deux Caps
Terre des Deux Caps